Arthur William White (11 June 1879 – 31 July 1960) was an Australian rules footballer who played for the Essendon Football Club in the Victorian Football League (VFL).

Notes

External links 
		

1879 births
1960 deaths
Australian rules footballers from Victoria (Australia)
Essendon Football Club players
VFL/AFL players born in England
English emigrants to colonial Australia
English players of Australian rules football
Sportspeople from London